Antoinette "Toni" Halliday (born 5 July 1964) is an English musician best known as the lead vocalist, lyricist, and occasional guitarist of the alternative rock band Curve, along with Dean Garcia.

She was also a member of the bands Photofitz, The Uncles, State of Play and Scylla. Halliday released solo work as Toni Halliday and Chatelaine. She collaborated with artists like Robert Plant, Recoil, The Future Sound of London, Leftfield, Paul van Dyk, Freaky Chakra, DJ? Acucrack, Headcase, The Killers, Acid Android, and Orbital.

Halliday has a contralto vocal range.

Early life and career
Halliday was born on 5 July 1964 in Parsons Green, London, and brought up in various locations across Europe, before eventually settling in Washington New Town, Tyne and Wear.

From 1978 to 1980, Halliday was the lead vocalist in a punk rock band named Photofitz (initially called The Incest), after which she left to start a solo career.

The first commercially released recording to feature Halliday was the single "The Smile and the Kiss" (1983) by the new wave band Bonk, on which she performed uncredited backing vocals. The following year, Halliday's new band The Uncles released the single "What's the Use of Pretending", whereupon the singer returned to performing backing vocals for other artists, including the Robert Plant albums Shaken 'n' Stirred (1985), and Now and Zen (1988).

In 1985, Halliday and multi-instrumentalist Dean Garcia formed the band State of Play together with Garcia's wife Julie Fletcher and Eurythmics drummer Olle Romö. The following year, State of Play released an LP on Virgin Records titled Balancing the Scales, a non-hit album that spawned two singles: "Natural Colour" and "Rock-a-bye Baby".

After the subsequent demise of State of Play, Halliday made another attempt at a solo career. Her album Hearts and Handshakes (produced by Halliday with Alan Moulder) was released in 1989, a year after it was finished, and four singles were taken from it, "Weekday", "Love Attraction", "Time Turns Around", and "Woman in Mind".

Curve
Dean Garcia had played on Hearts and Handshakes, and the pair now collaborated to form Curve, with Halliday serving as lead singer. Their partnership would last from 1990 to 2005. The group's main releases are the studio albums Doppelgänger (1992), Cuckoo (1993), Come Clean (1998), Gift (2001), The New Adventures of Curve (2002), and the compilations Radio Sessions (1993), Open Day at the Hate Fest (2001), The Way of Curve (2004), Rare and Unreleased (2010).

Scylla
In 1995, a year after the first, temporary dissolution of Curve, Halliday formed the band Scylla with Ricky Barber, Lindy Pocock, Fiona Lynsky and Julian Bown. The group toured small clubs in the summer of 1995. Scylla's only recording to have been officially released is the song "Helen's Face", which can be found on the Showgirls soundtrack of the Paul Verhoeven film of the same name. Another Scylla song, "Get a Helmet", can be heard in the Gregg Araki film Nowhere. Scylla recorded a 12-track demo with both Alan Moulder and Flood producing, but no album was released. A bootleg of these demo tracks can be found on the internet.

Other work
Following the emergence of Curve in 1991, Halliday co-wrote and performed vocals on two songs ("Edge to Life" and "Bloodline") for the Recoil album Bloodline (1992). She collaborated with The Future Sound of London for the song "Cerebral" from Lifeforms (1994), with Freaky Chakra for the song "Budded on Earth to Bloom in Heaven" from Lowdown Motivator (1994), and with Leftfield for their No. 18 UK hit "Original" from Leftism (1995). She was also featured on "Original"'s music video.

In 2002 Halliday recorded a number of songs with the Prague Philharmonic Orchestra with plans to release an EP. By the end of the sessions there were enough songs recorded for an album with a working title of "For Tomorrows Sorrows". For unknown reasons the album remains unreleased with the exception of the title track which was unofficially uploaded onto the internet.
One other song titled "All Flesh Is Grass" was made available on a very rare CDR by the label.

Halliday also collaborated with Headcase, Bias, Acid Android and DJ? Acucrack. In 2006, she was featured on the first The Killers Christmas track, "A Great Big Sled". She contributed vocals to Orbital's soundtrack for the 2012 re-make of the film Pusher.

In April 2013 Halliday contributed vocals to a new track "Lost In The Noise", a collaboration with Huw Williams. The track can be found on the compilation Ethereal Electro Pop on Altitude Music. Another new Toni Halliday track for 2013 (co produced by Louise Dowd) called "Down In A Dark Place" can be heard in a trailer for the television programme The Vampire Dairies. Along with "Down In A Dark Place" two other new songs "Nowhere To Hide" and "Now The Time Is Here" appeared.

Halliday's song Nowhere To Hide was officially used in Sochi Winter Olympics 2014 promotion and advertising.

Halliday released a new song "Suffragette" in November 2016 on the compilation album The Song Method 2. It is available on I-Tunes.

Halliday released four new songs in December 2017. "Deep State" and "Crashing Cars" can be found on the compilation album The Song Method 3, "Rebel Tattoo" is on the compilation album Psychedelic Indie and "Feel The Light" featuring Karen O on backing vocals can be found on the Swagger And Attitude 2 compilation.

In 2017 Dean and Toni contemplated a Curve reunion but ultimately Toni decided to declined to tour for the moment.

A new song "Voice of a Girl" was released in May 2019 on the compilation Female Songwriter for television and film through Universal Music. Halliday co wrote the song and sings backing vocals on the track but Louise Dowd (Chatelaine collaborator) sings the lead vocal.

In January 2021 Halliday released a new song Black Crow on the compilation The Song System. Black Crow is a co write as Antoinette Halliday with Louise Dowd.

In March 2021 Halliday released a new 6 track solo EP called Roll The Dice.
She continued to write and record with Louise Dowd.

In August 2021 Steve Thompson released "Iron Man Of Norton" and "Iron Man Of Norton: Second Shipment", two compilation albums of early songs and demos from 1980. Featured on these are seven songs by a sixteen year old Toni Halliday, now her earliest recordings released.

Chatelaine
In February 2008, Toni introduced a new solo project on MySpace called Chatelaine. Chatelaine's debut album Take a Line For a Walk was released in June 2010. It featured nine new tracks: "Broken Bones", "Oh Daddy", "Life Remains", "Stripped Out", "Shifting Sands", "Killing Feeling", "Take a Line For a Walk", "Head To Head" and "Seen and Lost".
Halliday continues to work on the next Chatelaine album and other forthcoming collaborations.

Personal life
Toni Halliday is married to the British record producer Alan Moulder.

Discography

State of Play
 Balancing the Scales (1986)

Toni Halliday

Studio albums
 Hearts and Handshakes (1989)
 For Tomorrow's Sorrows (recorded 2002 with the Prague Philharmonic Orchestra, unreleased)
 Roll The Dice (6 track EP, 2021)

Singles
"Weekday"
"Love Attraction"
"Time Turns Around"
"Woman in Mind"

Curve

 Pubic Fruit (1992)
 Doppelgänger (1992)
 Radio Sessions (1993)
 Cuckoo (1994)
 Come Clean (1998)
 Open Day at the Hate Fest (2001)
 Gift (2001)
 The New Adventures of Curve (2002)
 The Way of Curve (2004)
 Rare and Unreleased (2010)

Scylla
 Demos (recorded 1995, released 2008)

Chatelaine
 Take a Line for a Walk (2010)

Collaborations
Halliday provided vocals on the following songs:

She also provided backing vocals on the following releases:
 Robert Plant – Shaken 'n' Stirred (1985)
 Robert Plant – Now and Zen (1988)

References

External links
"Curve: Frequently Asked Questions #14" at curve-online.co.uk

1964 births
Living people
English women guitarists
English guitarists
English women singers
Women rock singers
Women new wave singers
People from Parsons Green
People from Fulham
Singers from London
21st-century English women singers
21st-century English singers